ISO-IR-111 or KOI8-E is an 8-bit character set. It is a multinational extension of KOI-8 for Belarusian, Macedonian, Serbian, and Ukrainian (except Ґґ which is added to KOI8-F). The name "ISO-IR-111" refers to its registration number in the ISO-IR registry, and denotes it as a set usable with ISO/IEC 2022.

The published editions of  instead correspond to subsequent editions of ECMA-113, which defines a different encoding.

Naming confusion

ISO-IR-111, the 1985 edition of ECMA-113 (also called "ECMA-Cyrillic" or "KOI8-E"), was based on the 1974 edition of GOST 19768 (i.e. KOI-8). In 1987 ECMA-113 was redesigned. These newer editions of ECMA-113 are equivalent to ISO-8859-5, and do not follow the KOI layout. This confusion has led to a common misconception that ISO-8859-5 was defined in or based on GOST 19768-74.

Possibly as another consequence of this,  erroneously lists a different codepage under the names "ISO-IR-111" and "ECMA-Cyrillic", resembling ISO-8859-5 with re-ordered rows, and partially compatible with Windows-1251. Due to concerns that existing implementations might use the RFC 1345 definition for those two labels, it was proposed that the IANA additionally recognise  as a label for ECMA-113:1985 content, and the IANA presently lists that label as an alias.

Character set
The following table shows the ISO-IR-111 encoding. Each character is shown with its equivalent Unicode code point.

Extended and modified versions
A modified version named KOI8 Unified or KOI8-F was used in software produced by Fingertip Software, adding the Ґ in its KOI8-U location (replacing the soft hyphen and displacing the universal currency sign), and adding some graphical characters in the C1 control codes area, mainly from KOI8-R and Windows-1251.

Incorrect RFC 1345 code page

 erroneously lists a different code page under the name ISO-IR-111, encoding the same Cyrillic characters but with a different layout. It resembles a mixture of Windows-1251 and ISO-8859-5. Specifically, line A_ corresponds to ISO-8859-5, lines C_ through F_ correspond to Windows-1251 (equivalent to lines B_ through E_ of ISO-8859-5), and line B_ nearly corresponds to line F_ of ISO-8859-5, with the exception of the § being replaced with a ¤.

Certain codes resemble ISO-IR-111 with flipped letter case, which may have contributed to the confusion. The majority differ and are shown below.

See also
KOI character encodings

References 

Character sets